The Strade Statali, abbreviated SS, is the Italian national network of state highways.

The Italian state highway network are maintained by ANAS. From 1928 until 1946 state highways were maintained by AASS.

History

The first 137 state highways were created in 1928 with the establishment of Azienda Autonoma delle Strade Statali (AASS).

Types of highway
Nowadays, a state highway can be classified in more types, except Type A highway, which is reserved to motorways.

The same types also are used for regional roads, provincial roads and municipal roads.

Type B

Type B highway is a dual carriageway with at least two lanes for each direction, paved shoulder on the right, no cross-traffic and no at-grade intersections. In Italy are called strade extraurbane principali. Beginning of Type B highway is marked by a traffic sign.

Type C
Type C highway is a single carriageway road. In Italy are called strade extraurbane secondarie.

Type D
Type D highway is a dual carriageway urban road with sidewalk. In Italy are called strade urbane di scorrimento.

If Type D highway travels across an urban area with more than 10,000 people, it is maintained by comuni, instead of ANAS.

Type E
Type E highway is a single carriageway urban road with sidewalk. In Italy are called strade urbane di quartiere.

If Type E highway travels across an urban area with more than 10,000 people, it is maintained by comuni, instead of ANAS.

Type F
Type F highway is a road, which it cannot be classified as Type B, Type C, Type D and Type E. In Italy are called strade locali.

An example of Type F highway is an urban road without sidewalk.

If Type F highway travels across an urban area with more than 10,000 people, it is maintained by comuni, instead of ANAS.

Downgrading of state highways
From 1998, state highways of Trentino-Alto Adige/Südtirol are maintained by South Tyrol or Trentino local governments.

From 2000, many state highways have been downgraded as regional road or provincial road. An example of downgraded state highway is SR 203, formerly SS.

See also
Transport in Italy

Other Italian roads
Autostrade of Italy
Regional road
Provincial road
Municipal road

External links
ANAS official site